The 1973–74 Cupa României was the 36th edition of Romania's most prestigious football cup competition.

The title was won by Jiul Petroşani against Politehnica Timişoara.

Format
The competition is an annual knockout tournament.

Each tie is played as a single leg on neutral ground.

If a match is drawn after 90 minutes, the game goes in extra time, and if the scored is still tight after 120 minutes, then the winner will be established at penalty kicks.

From the first edition, the teams from Divizia A entered in competition in sixteen finals, rule which remained till today.

Bracket

First round proper

|colspan=3 style="background-color:#FFCCCC;"|21 November 1973

|}

Second round proper

|colspan=3 style="background-color:#FFCCCC;"|5 December 1973

|}

Quarter-finals

|colspan=3 style="background-color:#FFCCCC;"|15 May 1974

|}

Semi-finals

|colspan=3 style="background-color:#FFCCCC;"|22 May 1974

|}

Final

References

External links
 romaniansoccer.ro
 Official site
 The Romanian Cup on the FRF's official site

Cupa României seasons
1973–74 in Romanian football
Romania